Andy Hardy's Blonde Trouble is a 1944 romantic comedy film directed by George B. Seitz. It is the fourteenth link starring Mickey Rooney as Andy Hardy. In the film, Andy goes to college, but soon gets in trouble with some pretty co-eds.

Plot
Blonde Trouble picks up from the previous installment of the Andy Hardy saga with Andy on a train to begin his college career at Wainwright College. While on the train, he meets Kay Wilson (Bonita Granville), and learns that Wainright College has just become a coeducational institution. The Dean of Wainwright College (and soon to be Andy's faculty advisor), Dr. Standish (Herbert Marshall) is also on the train. Dr. Standish's identity is not revealed to Andy until later.

Problems begin almost immediately for Andy as he learns his father forgot to give him his train ticket. Lyn and Lee  Walker (Wilde Twins) are also on the train in a private cabin. They are on their way to Wainright College as well, but their father thinks Lee is on her way to spend some time with her aunt in Vermont. The twins can't handle the idea of being separated, so they travel together to Wainright College in hopes of passing themselves off as one girl. On the train, and later at Wainwright, the girls pull the switcheroo on Andy, leaving him completely confused with this mysterious blonde's ever changing behavior.

After discovering that they have run out of money, the twins coax Andy into giving them a total of $37.95 cash before he realizes that he has been fooled. After classes at Wainwright College begin, Andy's troubles continue to build, causing him to consider quitting college. Before this happens, though, he manages to help the twins out of their trouble.

Cast

 Lewis Stone as Judge James K. Hardy
 Mickey Rooney as Andrew "Andy" Hardy
 Fay Holden as Mrs. Emily Hardy
 Sara Haden as Aunt Milly Forrest
 Herbert Marshall as Dr. M.J. Standish
 Bonita Granville as Kay Wilson
 Jean Porter as Katy Anderson
 Keye Luke as Dr. Lee Wong Howe
 Lee Wilde as Lee Walker
 Lyn Wilde as Lyn Walker
 Marta Linden as Mrs. Townsend
 Emory Parnell as Train Conductor

Production
Andy Hardy's Blonde Trouble was filmed at the MGM Studios in Culver City, California, with location shooting taking place at the University of Nevada at Reno. The film was shot from July to September 1943 prior to his induction into the US Army in June 1944; the film was released in 1944.

See also
List of American films of 1944

References

External links
 
 
 
 

1944 films
1944 romantic comedy films
American romantic comedy films
American black-and-white films
Films about twin sisters
Films directed by George B. Seitz
Metro-Goldwyn-Mayer films
Films with screenplays by William Ludwig
1940s English-language films
1940s American films